Jean Lisette Aroeste (2 October 1932 – August 2020) was a former University of California, Los Angeles librarian and Star Trek fan who became one of four writers with no prior television writing credits (David Gerrold, Judy Burns and Joyce Muskat were the other three) to sell scripts to the program.

Her first sale, "Is There in Truth No Beauty?", was an unsolicited script which Star Trek co-producer Robert H. Justman read and recommended to Gene Roddenberry. She then sold the story "A Handful of Dust", which was eventually produced as "All Our Yesterdays" – the second-to-last episode of the original Star Trek series. These two episodes were her only television sales.

She had previously been an acquisitions librarian at the Harvard University Library; after UCLA, she subsequently was head of References and Collection Development at the Princeton University Library.

References

External links
 
UCLA archives - collection contains script of the episodes she wrote.

1932 births
Living people
Princeton University librarians
Harvard University librarians
American women librarians
American librarians
Screenwriters from Virginia
Place of birth missing (living people)
University of California, Los Angeles staff
American women screenwriters
21st-century American women